Carl R. Gerlach is a former Mayor of Overland Park, Kansas. 

Gerlach was first elected as mayor in 2005, replacing Ed Eilert.  He ran unopposed in his next two elections in 2009 and 2013. Gerlach then beat his first challenger for mayor in 12 years, when he ran for a fourth term in 2017. Gerlach did not run in the city's 2021 mayoral election   and was succeeded by Overland Park city council member, Curt Skoog. 

Prior to that, he served on the city council from 1995 to 2005.   He is a Republican. 

Gerlach earned his bachelor's degree in business administration in 1976 from Kansas State University, where he also played on the men's basketball team. He was drafted by the Atlanta Hawks in 1976, but was released from his contract due to an injury suffered during training. Soon thereafter he started a career in the promotional products industry.

References

External links
Q&A: Overland Park Mayor Carl Gerlach from the Kansas City Business Journal
 Campaign page

Living people
Atlanta Hawks draft picks
Mayors of places in Kansas
Kansas State University alumni
Kansas State Wildcats men's basketball players
Kansas Republicans
21st-century American politicians
American men's basketball players
Year of birth missing (living people)